John Hudson (born 4 August 1940) is an Australian former representative rower. He competed in the men's coxed four event at the 1960 Summer Olympics.

Club and state rowing
Hudson's senior rowing was from the Leichhardt Rowing Club where he was club captain in 1964. 

Hudson first made state selection for New South Wales in the 1959 men's senior eight which contested and won the King's Cup at the 1959 Australian Interstate Regatta. He made further King's Cup appearances for New South Wales in 1960, 1963 and 1964.

At the second ever Australian Rowing Championships held in 1964, Hudson contested the national coxless fours title in Leichhardt colours. That crew placed second.

International representative rowing
For the 1960 Rome Olympics the selected Australian eight was the winning King's Cup West Australian eight. A coxed four was selected as the fourth priority boat and a New South Wales four was picked with Hudson in the two seat. In Rome they were the only Australian crew to make the Olympic final and finished in fifth place.

References

1940 births
Living people
Australian male rowers
Olympic rowers of Australia
Rowers at the 1960 Summer Olympics
Rowers from Sydney
20th-century Australian people